Barker is an unincorporated community in Wetzel County, West Virginia, United States. It was also known as Mohr.

References 

Unincorporated communities in West Virginia
Unincorporated communities in Wetzel County, West Virginia